London Musici is a chamber orchestra founded in 1988 by Mark Stephenson. It has given over 1000 performances as the associate orchestra for the Rambert Dance Company and has won numerous awards.

References

External links
London Musici website

Chamber orchestras
London orchestras
Musical groups established in 1988